Shurooq Amin (born 1967) is a Kuwaiti painter and poet.

Early life and education

Shurooq Amin was born in Kuwait in 1967 to a Kuwaiti father and a Syrian mother. Her father died when she was 11. She earned her BA in English literature from Kuwait University in 1988 and her MA in modern literature from Kent University in 1989. She earned her PhD in creative writing from Warnborough College in 2007, specialising in Ekphrastic art and poetry.

Career

Painting

Amin is a lecturer at Kuwait University, where she heads the College of Business Administration's English Language Unit.

Since her first solo exhibition in 1992, Amin's works have evolved to explore religion and sexuality, challenging cultural and societal boundaries. In 2009 and 2010 she exhibited Society Girls in Kuwait and London. The subject of her 2012 exhibition at Al M Gallery, It's a Man's World, was men in GCC countries. Kuwait City officials shut down the show three hours after its opening, deeming the content "pornographic". According to Amin the authorities focused on a work depicting three card-playing men "drinking 'grape juice' from a bottle which suggested contraband alcohol" and her work My Mistress and Family, which portrays a man with a woman in a minidress sitting in his lap. Her 2013 exhibition in Dubai, Popcornographic, explored taboos in Middle Eastern society. She is represented by Ayyam Gallery. In 2013, she was awarded Artist of the Year by Arab Woman Awards.

Poetry

Amin writes short stories and poetry. In 1994 she published the poetry collection Kuwaiti Butterfly Unveiled. Her writings have appeared in the literary journals Words-Myth, Etchings, Diode, and Beauty/Truth. She was nominated for a Pushcart Prize in December 2007 for her poem "Framboise Fig and Bronze Nude".

References

External links

1967 births
Living people
Alumni of the University of Kent
Kuwait University alumni
20th-century Kuwaiti poets
Kuwaiti women artists
Kuwaiti contemporary artists
21st-century Kuwaiti poets